Shinrei Dam  is an earthfill dam located in Kagoshima Prefecture in Japan. The dam is used for irrigation and water supply. The catchment area of the dam is 3.4 km2. The dam impounds about 9  ha of land when full and can store 808 thousand cubic meters of water. The construction of the dam was started on 1972 and completed in 1981.

See also
List of dams in Japan

References

Dams in Kagoshima Prefecture